Wanderson Souza Carneiro (born 23 February 1987), known as Baiano, is a Brazilian professional footballer who plays as a right back.

Club career
Born in Correntina, Bahia, Baiano spent most of his career in his country in the lower leagues. His professional input consisted of six Série B games for Vila Nova Futebol Clube, who finished in 20th and last position.

In late July 2008, Baiano moved to Portugal where he would remain the following decade, starting with C.F. Os Belenenses. He appeared rarely for the Lisbon-based club in his only season, as the team suffered relegation from the Primeira Liga only to be reinstated due to C.F. Estrela da Amadora's financial irregularities.

Baiano signed with fellow league side F.C. Paços de Ferreira in summer 2009, where his performances were eventually noted. He scored his first goal in the Portuguese top division on 19 September 2010, helping to a 2–2 home draw against S.C. Braga.

In the 2011 off-season, Baiano joined Braga on a free transfer. He played 42 competitive matches in the 2015–16 campaign, including the final of the Taça de Portugal, won on penalties against FC Porto after a 2–2 draw in 120 minutes.

On 2 September 2017, free agent Baiano signed for Spanish Segunda División club Rayo Vallecano. He totalled more than 3,000 minutes of action during his only season, helping them return to La Liga after two years.

Baiano joined Alanyaspor of the Turkish Süper Lig on 28 June 2018, after his contract expired.

Honours
Braga
Taça de Portugal: 2015–16
Taça da Liga: 2012–13

Rayo Vallecano
Segunda División: 2017–18

References

External links

1987 births
Living people
Brazilian footballers
Association football defenders
Campeonato Brasileiro Série B players
Campeonato Brasileiro Série C players
Vila Nova Futebol Clube players
Clube Recreativo e Atlético Catalano players
Grêmio Esportivo Anápolis players
Primeira Liga players
Liga Portugal 2 players
C.F. Os Belenenses players
F.C. Paços de Ferreira players
S.C. Braga players
S.C. Braga B players
C.D. Nacional players
Segunda División players
Rayo Vallecano players
Süper Lig players
Alanyaspor footballers
Brazilian expatriate footballers
Expatriate footballers in Portugal
Expatriate footballers in Spain
Expatriate footballers in Turkey
Brazilian expatriate sportspeople in Portugal
Brazilian expatriate sportspeople in Spain
Brazilian expatriate sportspeople in Turkey